Pierre Trullemans (born 28 March 1898, date of death unknown) was a Belgian long-distance runner. He competed in the men's 5000 metres at the 1920 Summer Olympics.

References

External links

1898 births
Year of death missing
Athletes (track and field) at the 1920 Summer Olympics
Belgian male long-distance runners
Olympic athletes of Belgium
Place of birth missing
Olympic cross country runners